William Charles Albright (April 4, 1929 – January 17, 2013) was an all-star lineman who played in the Canadian Football League and the National Football League.

Albright played college football at the University of Wisconsin-Madison. He was drafted in the twentieth round of the 1951 NFL Draft by the New York Giants and played four seasons (47 games) with the team. Most notably, he scored 1 touchdown on a fumble return.

He finished his career in the CFL. Playing 3 seasons with the Toronto Argonauts he was an all-star 3 times; twice in 1956, for both offensive and defensive line. He played one game for the Montreal Alouettes in 1958.

References

Sportspeople from Racine, Wisconsin
Players of American football from Wisconsin
Players of Canadian football from Wisconsin
American football offensive linemen
Canadian football offensive linemen
New York Giants players
Toronto Argonauts players
Montreal Alouettes players
Wisconsin Badgers football players
2013 deaths
1929 births
Sportspeople from the Milwaukee metropolitan area